Embassy of Republic Latvia to the United Kingdom is a diplomatic mission in London.
 The Consular Section for passports, visas and other services is located at The Grove House, 248A Marylebone Road, London, NW1 6JF (entrance from Lisson Grove Street).

References

External links
 Official site

Latvia
Diplomatic missions of Latvia
Latvia–United Kingdom relations
Buildings and structures in the City of Westminster
Marylebone